Infrastructure Canada (INFC) is a department of the Government of Canada responsible for the federal public infrastructure policy. Construction and development of infrastructure is primarily the responsibility of provincial/territorial and municipal governments, as such, much of the department's work involves co-financing projects with other levels of government.

The department is responsible to Parliament through the minister of intergovernmental affairs, infrastructure and communities.

History 
The Office of Infrastructure of Canada (Infrastructure Canada) was created as a federal department in 2002 via an Order in Council issued pursuant to the Financial Administration Act. The department was mandated to enter into funding agreements with Canada's provinces, territories and municipalities for the purpose of supporting strategic infrastructure projects across Canada.

There are two programs managed by the department that have their own federal legislation: the Canada Strategic Infrastructure Fund, and the Gas Tax Fund.

Programs 
Infrastructure Canada is the lead federal department responsible for infrastructure policy development and program delivery. The department makes investments for both local and regional infrastructure needs. In the first year after its creation, the department invested mostly in water and wastewater plants, highways, culture, recreation, and broadband projects.

During the Great Recession, the department was tasked with implementing the Harper government's economic stimulus package.

In January 2016 the Trudeau government announced a two-year, $10 billion plan to repair infrastructure across the country.

Branches and sub-agencies
The Department is made up of five branches:
 The Policy and Results Branch 
 The Program Operations Branch 
 The Corporate Services Branch 
 The Audit and Evaluation Branch
 The Communications Branch
Some of the sub-agencies of the Department include:
 Windsor-Detroit Bridge Authority
 Waterfront Toronto
 Jacques Cartier Bridges Incorporated 
 PPP Canada (from 2009 to 2018)

References

Notes

External links 
 

Federal departments and agencies of Canada
Investment promotion agencies
Funding bodies of Canada